Phillip Neil Archer (born 17 March 1972) is an English professional golfer.

Career
Archer was born in Warrington. He is best known for shooting a score of 60 in the first round at the Celtic Manor Wales Open in 2006. He had a chance of being the first player on the European Tour to shoot a 59, but missed his birdie putt on the 18th green.  His best European Tour Order of Merit finish is 29th in 2007. He lost his card after the 2010 season. He has won three tournaments on the Challenge Tour, Europe's second-tier tour. He won the Rolex Trophy in 2004, the Allianz Open Côtes d'Armor Bretagne in 2011 and the Pacific Rubiales Colombia Classic in 2012.

Professional wins (8)

Challenge Tour wins (3)

*Note: The 2004 Rolex Trophy was shortened to 54 holes due to rain.

Challenge Tour playoff record (0–1)

PGA EuroPro Tour wins (1)

Other wins (4)
2000 Leeds Cup
2016 Leeds Cup
2021 Leeds Cup
2022 Leeds Cup

Playoff record
European Tour playoff record (0–1)

European Senior Tour playoff record (0–1)

Results in major championships

Note: Archer never played in the Masters Tournament or the PGA Championship.

CUT = missed the half-way cut
"T" = tied

Team appearances
Professional
Seve Trophy (representing Great Britain & Ireland): 2007 (winners)
PGA Cup (representing Great Britain and Ireland): 2017 (winners)

See also
2009 European Tour Qualifying School graduates

References

External links

English male golfers
European Tour golfers
Sportspeople from Warrington
1972 births
Living people